The 1992 Tour of the Basque Country was the 32nd edition of the Tour of the Basque Country cycle race and was held from 6 April to 10 April 1992. The race was won by Tony Rominger of the CLAS–Cajastur team.

General classification

References

1992
Bas